Bill Dane (aka Bill Zulpo-Dane, born William Thacher Dane on November 12, 1938) is a North American street photographer. Dane pioneered a way to subsidize his public by using photographic postcards. He has mailed over 50,000 of his pictures as photo-postcards since 1969.  As of 2007, Dane's method for making his photographs available shifted from mailing photo-postcards to offering his entire body of work on the internet.

Education
Dane studied Political Science and Art/Painting at the University of California, Berkeley.  He graduated with a BA in 1964, and a MA in Art/Painting in 1968.  Dane painted for seven years before discovering photography in 1969.  He worked with Diane Arbus and Lee Friedlander at Hampshire College in the summer of 1971.

Photographic career

Dane was recognized by the John Simon Guggenheim Memorial Foundation with Guggenheim Fellowships in 1973 and 1982. He received Fellowships from the National Endowment for the Arts in 1976 and 1977. He used his grants to photograph inside and outside North America.  The results of Dane's explorations have been viewed on his photo-postcards, in exhibitions, catalogs, books, magazines, and over the internet.  Unfamiliar Places: A Message From Bill Dane was his seminal exhibit at the Museum of Modern Art in 1973.  While Dane continues as a straight, still photographer working in public places, his pictures have evolved dramatically over time.

Collections
Dane's photographs are held in the following permanent public collections:

Amon Carter Museum, Fort Worth, TX
Art Institute of Chicago, Chicago, IL
Bibliothèque Nationale, Paris
Fogg Museum, Harvard University, Cambridge, MA
Madison Art Center, Madison, Wisconsin, WI
Metropolitan Museum of Art, New York
Museum of Fine Arts, Boston, MA
Museum of Fine Arts, Houston, TX
Museum of Modern Art, New York
National Gallery of Art, Washington D.C.
Oakland Museum, Oakland, CA
Ohio State University Libraries, Columbus, OH
Provincial Museum, Granada, Spain
San Francisco Museum of Modern Art, San Francisco, CA
Smithsonian American Art Museum / National Portrait Gallery Library, Washington, D.C.

Reactions of notable critics
 A. D. Coleman "Now, if I were a photographer myself, I would be deeply Insulted by this show. I would be insulted that an institution so prestigious and powerful as the Museum of Modern Art would present, as photographically exemplary, a collection of random snapshots by someone who has not even established enough craft competence to make his disregard of craft standards a significant esthetic choice."
 John Szarkowski: "It seems to me that the subject of Bill Dane’s pictures is the discovery of lyric beauty in Oakland, or the discovery of surprise and delight in what we had been told was a wasteland of boredom, the discovery of classical measure in the heart of God’s own junkyard, the discovery of a kind of optimism, still available at least to the eye."
 Patricia Bosworth: "In class [Diane Arbus] kept stressing the factual, the literal, the specificity inherent in photography. She loved Bill Dane’s postcard photographs of American landscapes."
 Diana Edkins: "The adequacy of meaning lies in what we recognize as the intensity of Dane’s human response."
 Ann Swidler: "A strain of American photography since Robert Frank has concerned itself with finding what is centrally American - attempting the great American novel in visual form." "The greatest American stories, like The Deerslayer, Huckleberry Finn, or Moby Dick, were boys’ stories, written for a culture which didn't want to grow up. Yet in their secret hearts, those stories were about evil and the kind of redemption that might come from confronting its mysteries." "Dane shows us not an exotic heart of darkness, but the American difficulty in dealing with what we cannot understand, own, or control." "Bill Dane's photographs seem to be about foreignness, both here and abroad.  But they are really about us as Americans.  They ask whether we can learn to love - not because alien worlds accommodate themselves to what we expect, but because we have learned to see even where we cannot understand."
 Jeffrey Fraenkel: "'What’s that?' is not an uncommon response for viewers confronting one of Bill Dane’s photographs. This is a curious question, given the fact that Dane approaches the 'real world' with his camera as squarely as Atget, Evans, or Friedlander.  He photographs what exists, with no manipulation or fabrication."
  Sandra S. Phillips: "The vision of the world of Bill Dane, both inside and outside America, is often downright funny. But often, it is also a tragic vision. In his photographs are voltages, a disturbing strangeness."
 Bill Berkson: "Dane has cast himself as a surveyor of ceremonies stuck deep in our wishful, ornamental glut, our fuss."

References

Further reading

Dane, Bill: pictures, Katherine Mills: design, Gary Bogus: binding.  Little Known, Handmade Book,  Bill Dane, Albany, CA, 1983
Gollonet, Carlos, Coordina. Catalog to accompany the Exhibition, Bill Dane Photographs Outside and Inside America, Diputacion Provencial De Granada, Spain and The Fraenkel Gallery, 1993
Di Rosa, Rene.  Local Color, Chronicle Books, San Francisco, 1999, words: p. 10, words and picture: pp. 82–83
FitzGibbon, John.  California A-Z and Return, The Butler Institute, Youngstown, Ohio, 1990, words and picture: p. 12
Graphis Press, Robert Delpire Introduction.  Fine Art Photography ‘95, Graphis Publishing, Zurich, Switzerland, 1995, picture: p. 79
Galassi, Peter.  Walker Evans & Company, The Museum of Modern Art, New York, 2000, picture: p. 195
Gomez, Yolanda Romero, Coordina. Exhibit: Bill Dane Photographs Outside and Inside America, Diputacion Provencial De Granada, Spain, 1993
Green, Jonathan.  The Snapshot, New York, Aperture Foundation, 1974, pictures: pp. 96–105
Harris, Melissa, ed.  APERTURE, # 124, Collection of Joshua P. Smith, summer 1991, picture: p. 32
Heyman, Therese.  Slices of Time: California Landscapes 1860 -1880, 1960–1980,  Oakland, Oakland Museum, 1981, picture: p. 21
Munsterberg, Marjorie. Calendar,  On Time, The Museum of Modern Art, New York, 1974, pictures: week of Aug 25
Noble, Alexandra and Nigel Barley, et al.  The Animal in Photography1843-1985, The Photographer's Gallery, London, 1986, picture: p. 9
Osman, Colin and Peter Turner.  Creative Camera, Sept. 1976, pictures: pp. 308–311
Phillips, Sandra.  Crossing the Frontier: Photographs of the Developing West, 1849 to the Present, San Francisco Museum of Modern Art and Chronicle Books, San Francisco 1996, picture: plate103
Phillips, Sandra.  Exposed: Voyeurism, Surveillance, and the Camera Since 1870,  San Francisco Museum of Modern Art with Yale University Press, 2010, words: p. 23, picture: pl.30
Rubinfien, Leo.  Love/Hate Relations, Review of work by Tod Papageorge and Bill Dane, ARTFORUM, NY, Vol. 26, #10, Summer 1978, words: pp. 46–51, pictures: pp. 46,50,51
Silverman, Ruth.  Athletes, New York, Alfred A. Knopf, 1987, picture: p. 123
Silverman, Ruth.  Dog Days, San Francisco, Chronicle Books, 1989, picture: week of Aug 8
Silverman, Ruth.  The Dog, San Francisco, Chronicle Books, 2000, picture: p. 79
Silverman, Ruth.  San Francisco Observed, San Francisco, Chronicle Books, 1986, picture: p. 116
Szarkowski, John.  American Landscapes, The Museum of Modern Art, New York, 1981, picture: p. 72
Szarkowski, John.  Mirrors and Windows, The Museum of Modern Art, New York, 1978, pictures: pp. 122–123
Turner, Peter, ed.  American Images: Photography 1945–1980, London, Penguin Books/Barbican Art gallery, 1985, words-picture: p. 162
Velick, Bruce.  A Kiss is Just A Kiss, Crown Publishers, N.Y. 1990, picture: p. 38

External links
 
 Dane's seminal show at MoMA: Unfamiliar Places: A Message From Bill Dane
 An Interview with Dane by Elliott Linwood

1938 births
Living people
American photographers
Postcard publishers
University of California, Berkeley alumni
Place of birth missing (living people)